Alan Ferguson may refer to:
 Alan Ferguson (politician)
 Alan Ferguson (director)

See also
 Allan Ferguson , Scottish footballer